Hiatus for petrosal nerve can refer to:
 Hiatus for greater petrosal nerve or hiatus of the facial canal (hiatus canalis nervi petrosi majoris or hiatus canalis facialis)
 Hiatus for lesser petrosal nerve (hiatus canalis nervi petrosi minoris)